Epistemology (from Greek ἐπιστήμη – episteme-, "knowledge, science" and λόγος, "logos") or theory of knowledge is the branch of philosophy concerned with the nature and scope (limitations) of knowledge. It addresses the questions "What is knowledge?", "How is knowledge acquired?", "What do people know?", "How do we know what we know?", and "Why do we know what we know?". Much of the debate in this field has focused on analyzing the nature of knowledge and how it relates to similar notions such as truth, belief, and justification. It also deals with the means of production of knowledge, as well as skepticism about different knowledge claims.

Articles related to epistemology include:

A 

– "A Defence of Common Sense"
– A posteriori
– A priori and a posteriori
– A Treatise Concerning the Principles of Human Knowledge
– Abductive reasoning
– Academic skepticism
– Acatalepsy
– Ad hoc hypothesis
– Adaptive representation
– Adolph Stöhr
– Aenesidemus
– Aenesidemus (book)
– African Spir
– Against Method
– Agnosticism
– Agrippa the Skeptic
– Alethiology
– Alief (belief)
– Alison Wylie
– Alvin Goldman
– An Enquiry Concerning Human Understanding
– An Essay Concerning Human Understanding
– Analytic–synthetic distinction
– Anamnesis (philosophy)
– Androcentrism
– Android epistemology
– Anthony Wilden
– Anti-foundationalism
– Anti-realism
– Apperception
– Arda Denkel
– Argument from illusion
– Aristotle's theory of universals
– Arnór Hannibalsson
– Ásta Kristjana Sveinsdóttir
– Atli Harðarson
– Atomism
– Autoepistemic logic
– Ayn Rand

B 

– Barry Stroud
– Basic belief
– Basic limiting principle
– Belief
– Bertrand Russell
– Bertrand Russell's views on philosophy
– Björn Kraus
– Black swan theory
– Blind men and an elephant
– Body of knowledge
– Brain in a vat
– Brute fact

C 

– C. D. Broad
– Carper's fundamental ways of knowing
– Cartesian doubt
– Cartesian other
– Cartesian Self
– Catherine Elgin
– Causal chain
– Causal Theory of Knowing
– Causality
– Center Leo Apostel for Interdisciplinary Studies
– Centre de Recherche en Epistémologie Appliquée
– Certainty
– Claudio Canaparo
– Cogito ergo sum
– Cognitive closure (philosophy)
– Cognitive synonymy
– Coherence theory of truth
– Coherentism
– Common sense
– Compensationism
– Composition of Causes
– Computational epistemology
– Concluding Unscientific Postscript to Philosophical Fragments
– Condition of possibility
– Consensus theory of truth
– Constructivism (mathematics)
– Constructivist epistemology
– Contextualism
– Contrastivism
– Correspondence theory of truth
– Counterintuitive
– Crispin Wright
– Criteria of truth
– Critical rationalism
– Critical realism
– Critical thinking
– Cynicism

D 

– Daniel M. Hausman
– David Hume
– Deductive closure
– Defeasible reasoning
– Defeater
– Deflationary theory of truth
– Descriptive knowledge
– Dharmarāja Adhvarin
– Dialetheism
– Dianoia
– Direct and indirect realism
– Direct experience
– Discourse on the Method
– Disjunctivism
– Dispositional and occurrent belief
– Divine command theory– Daimonic
– Dogma
– Doubt
– Doxa
– Doxastic attitudes
– Dream argument
– Duck test

E 

– Eastern epistemology
– Ecology of contexts
– Edgar Morin
– Editology
– Edmund Gettier
– Educology
– Egocentric predicament
– Elephant test
– Emergence
– Empirical evidence
– Empirical method
– Empirical relationship
– Empirical research
– Empiricism
– Endoxa
– Enneads
– Epilogism
– Episteme
– Epistemic closure
– Epistemic commitment
– Epistemic community
– Epistemic conservatism
– Epistemic feedback
– Epistemic minimalism
– Epistemic possibility
– Epistemic theories of truth
– Epistemic theory of miracles
– Epistemic virtue
– Epistemicism
– Epistemocracy
– Epistemological anarchism
– Epistemological idealism
– Epistemological particularism
– Epistemological pluralism
– Epistemological psychology
– Epistemological realism
– Epistemological rupture
– Epistemological solipsism
– Epistemology
– Epoché
– Eristic
– Ernst von Glasersfeld
– Eureka effect
– Everett W. Hall
– Evidence
– Evidentialism
– Evil demon
– Evolutionary argument against naturalism
– Evolutionary epistemology
– Exclusion principle (philosophy)
– Existential phenomenology
– Exoteric
– Expectation (epistemic)
– Experience
– Experiential knowledge
– Experientialism
– Extended mind thesis
– Externism
– Eyewitness testimony

F 

– Fact
– Factual relativism
– Fact–value distinction
– Faith and rationality
– Fallibilism
– Falsifiability
– Feminist epistemology
– Fideism
– Finitism
– Fitch's paradox of knowability
– Fooled by Randomness
– Formal epistemology
– Formative epistemology
– Foundationalism
– Foundherentism
– Fragmentalism
– Frame problem
– Frank Cameron Jackson
– Fred Dretske
– Frederick Wilhelmsen
– Functional contextualism

G 

– G. E. Moore
– Gaston Bachelard
– Generativity
– Genetic epistemology
– George Berkeley
– George Pappas
– Gettier problem
– Giambattista Vico
– Gila Sher
– Gilbert Harman
– Gilbert Ryle
– Giulio Giorello
– Gnosiology
– Gödel's incompleteness theorems

H 

– Harry Binswanger
– Heinz von Foerster
– Helmut Wautischer
– Here is one hand
– Hierarchical epistemology
– Hilary Kornblith
– Humanism
– Hume's fork

I 

– I know it when I see it
– I know that I know nothing
– Ideological criticism
– Ideology
– Ignoramus et ignorabimus
– Ignorance
– Illuminationism
– Immanuel Kant
– Incorrigibility
– Indeterminacy (philosophy)
– Inductive reasoning
– Inductivism
– Infallibilism
– Infallibility
– Inference
– Infinitism
– Information source
– Innatism
– Insight
– Intellectual responsibility
– Internalism and externalism
– Intersubjective verifiability
– Intersubjectivity
– Introduction to Objectivist Epistemology
– Introspection
– Intuition (Bergson)
– Intuition (philosophy)
– Intuition (psychology)
– Intuitionism
– Irrealism (philosophy)
– Is Logic Empirical?
– Islamization of knowledge

J 

– Jean Piaget
– Jean-Louis Le Moigne
– Jean-Michel Berthelot
– John Greco (philosopher)
– John Hick
– John Locke
– John Searle
– Jonathan Dancy
– Jonathan Kvanvig
- Jules Vuillemin
– Justified true belief

K 

– Karla Jessen Williamson
– Katalepsis
– Keith Lehrer
– KK thesis
– Knowing and the Known
– Knowledge
– Knowledge and Its Limits
– Knowledge by acquaintance
– Knowledge by description
– Knowledge organization
– Knowledge relativity

L 

– Laplace's demon
– Larry Laudan
– Larry Sanger
– Latitudinarianism (philosophy)
– Laurence BonJour
– Law (principle)
– Leap of faith
– Leonard Peikoff
– Levels of adequacy
– List of epistemologists
– Logical holism
– Logical positivism
– Lottery paradox

M 

– Maieutics
– Map–territory relation
– Margaret Elizabeth Egan
– Mathematical proof
– Meditations on First Philosophy
– Memory
– Meno
– Meno's slave
– Meta
– Meta-epistemology
– Metaphor in philosophy
– Metaphysical naturalism
– Metatheory
– Methodism (philosophy)
– Methodological solipsism
– Michel de Montaigne
– Molyneux's problem
– Moore's paradox
– Moral rationalism
– Multiperspectivalism
– Mundane reason

N 

– Naïve empiricism
– Naïve realism
– Nassim Nicholas Taleb
– Naturalism (philosophy)
– Naturalized epistemology
– Nayef Al-Rodhan
– Neopragmatism
– Neutrality (philosophy)
– New realism (philosophy)
– Nicholas Rescher
– Niklas Luhmann
– Nomothetic
– Nomothetic and idiographic
– Noogony
– Norman Malcolm
– Noumenon

O 

– Object (philosophy)
– Objectivity (philosophy)
– Observation
– Ontologism
– Omphalos hypothesis
– Opinion
– Outline of epistemology
– Overbelief

P 

– P. F. Strawson
– Pancritical rationalism
– Panrationalism
– Paradigm
– Paradigm shift
– Participatory theory
– Paul Churchland
– Perception
– Perceptual learning
– Peripatetic axiom
– Perspectivism
– Pessimism
– Peter Millican
– Peter Unger
– Phenomenal conservatism
– Phenomenalism
– Phillip H. Wiebe
– Philosophic burden of proof
– Philosophical Fragments
– Philosophical Investigations
– Philosophical problems of testimony
– Philosophical skepticism
– Philosophical theology
– Philosophical zombie
– Philosophy of color
– Philosophy of perception
– Philosophy of science
– Plato's Problem
– Platonic epistemology
– Pluralism (philosophy)
– Pluralist theories of truth
– Positivism
– Postfoundationalism
– Postmodern philosophy
– Postpositivism
– Pragmatic theory of truth
– Pramāṇa
– Praxeology
– Predictive power
– Preface paradox
– Preformation theory
– Presentationism
– Presupposition (philosophy)
– Primary/secondary quality distinction
– Principle of charity
– Private language argument
– Privileged access
– Probabilism
– Probability interpretations
– Problem of induction
– Problem of other minds
– Problem of the criterion
– Problem of universals
– Procedural knowledge
– Proof (truth)
– Propensity probability
– Propositional attitude
– Pseudointellectual
– Psychological nominalism
– Pyrrho
– Pyrrhonism

Q 

– Quantification

R 

– Ramification problem
– Rational egoism
– Rational fideism
– Rational ignorance
– Rationalism
– Rationality
– Reason
– Redundancy theory of truth
– Reformed epistemology
– Regress argument
– Relevant alternatives theory
– Reliabilism
– Religious epistemology
– Robert Audi
– Robert Nozick
– Roderick Chisholm
– Role of chance in scientific discoveries

S 

– Sally Haslanger
– Satya
– Scepticism and Animal Faith
– Scottish Common Sense Realism
– Self-evidence
– Semantic externalism
– Semantic theory of truth
– Sensualism
– Sextus Empiricus
– Sherrilyn Roush
– Simulated reality
– Simulation hypothesis
– Skepticism
– Sleeping Beauty problem
– Social constructionism
– Social epistemology
– Social Epistemology (journal)
– Sociology of knowledge
– Socrates
– Solipsism
– Sophist (dialogue)
– Speculative reason
– Steve Fuller (sociologist)
– Subjectivism
– Swamping problem
– Swampman
– Systemography

T 

– Tabula rasa
– Tarski's undefinability theorem
– Techne
– Telesis
– Testimony
– The Black Swan (Taleb book)
– The Course in Positive Philosophy
– The Extended Mind
– The Postmodern Condition
– The Republic (Plato)
– The Roots of Reference
– The Will to Believe
– The World as Will and Representation
– Theaetetus (dialogue)
– Theory of Forms
– Theory of justification
– There are known knowns
– Thick Black Theory
– Thought experiment
– Transcendent truth
– Transcendental idealism
– Transcendental philosophy
– Transcendental realism
– Transparency (philosophy)
– Trenton Merricks
– Truth
– Truth by consensus
– Truth predicate
– Truth-value link
– Twin Earth thought experiment
– Two Dogmas of Empiricism
– Two truths doctrine

U 

– Uncertainty
– Underdetermination
– Understanding
– Universal pragmatics
– Unknown known
– Unobservable
– Upamāṇa

V 

– Vagueness
– Vasily Seseman
– Verification theory
– Verificationism
– Verisimilitude
– Veritism
– Vienna Circle
– Virtue epistemology
– Visual space
– Voluntarism (metaphysics)

W 

– Walter Terence Stace
– Ward Jones
– Wilfrid Sellars
– William Alston
– William Crathorn
– Word and Object
– World Hypotheses
– World view

X 

– Xenophanes

See also 
 Philosophy

References 

Epistemology